Ctirad (Polish: Czcirad) is a Slavic origin male given name derived from the elements: čest / chest "honour" and rad "care, joy". 
Maybe, it means "he honours advice" or "worshiping advice".

Name Days 
Czech: 16 January

Nicknames 
Ctishek, Ctisha, Radek, Ctirek, Rado, Ches

Famous bearers 
 In Czech mythology (as told in The Maidens' War), the nobleman Ctirad was killed by Šárka and the other rebel maidens 
 Ctirad Mašín, 1950s Czech resistance fighter
 Ctirad Kohoutek, Czech composer, music theorist, and pedagogue
 Ctirad Uher, Czech physicist at the University of Michigan in Ann Arbor

Another 
 Ctirad - poem by Julius Zeyer (complete text: here)

External links 
Ctirad on Behind The Name

Slavic masculine given names
Czech masculine given names
Slovak masculine given names
Polish masculine given names